Ghansali (Village ID 42916) is located in Ghansali Tehsil of Tehri Garhwal district in Uttarakhand, India. Ghansali town offers a splendid beauty of Bhilangana River on one side and dense forest at other. According to the 2011 census it has a population of 392 living in 82 households. Its main agriculture product is paddy growing.

A historical Hanuman Temple in Ghansali is a major attraction for tourists. Every year a fair is organized at Hanuman temple attended by a large number of local people. Places of interest near Ghansali are New Tehri Dam, Buda Kedar, Gangi, etc. One can reach Ghansali by hiring a taxi from Rishikesh, Dehradun, or Rudraprayag. The nearest railway station to reach Ghansali is at Dehradun and Rishikesh. It is a special route for Gangotri to Kedarnath yatra.

It is also an important point for Gangotri to Yamunotri yatra. Ghansali is an Assembly Seat in District Tehri Garwhal area.

Ghansali is the Tehsil headquarters and blocks Bhilangana. Aghori is the largest village in this tehsil. This block is the largest in Uttarakhand state.

The climatic condition in Ghansali during summer is too warm and in winter it is too cold. or can be changed according to the weather. Climatic condition in Ghansali during summer is  mild hot and in winter is too much cold.

Importance

Ghansali is an important route for char Dham pilgrimages. It is a special route for Gangotri to Kedarnath yatra. 

Ghansali is the Tehsil headquarters and block Bhilangana. Akhori is the largest village in this tehsil. This block is the largest in Uttarakhand state.
Ghansali is situated near the banks of Bhilangna River, which is a tributary of Bhagirathi River (Ganga).

References

Cities and towns in Tehri Garhwal district